UGF may refer to:
Ukrainian Ground Forces, the land forces of Ukraine
Union of Greens and Farmers, a left of centre environmentalism political alliance in Latvia.
Unipol Gruppo Finanziario, an Italian financial services company.
United Givers Fund, a charitable fundraising campaign in the United States
University of Great Falls, a private Catholic university located in Great Falls, Montana, U.S.A.
Urogenital fistula, an abnormal tract that exist between the vagina and bladder, ureters, or urethra